List of Ships of the Victorian Naval Forces, 1855–1901:

A

B

C

E

F

G

L

N

V

References
Warships of Australia, Ross Gillett, Illustrations Colin Graham, Rigby Limited, 1977, 

 
Victorian Naval Forces ships
Victorian Naval Forces ships